DeNorval Unthank Park, commonly known as Unthank Park, is a city park in the Boise neighborhood of Portland, Oregon, United States.

Description and history
Unthank Park is named for DeNorval Unthank, a prominent African American doctor and community leader, who was one of the first black doctors in the state. It was acquired by the City of Portland in 1966 and named for Unthank in 1969. The park was rededicated in June 2011 in a ceremony honoring Unthank.

Amenities include a basketball court, baseball field, playground, and picnic tables.

See also
 List of parks in Portland, Oregon

References

1966 establishments in Oregon
Boise, Portland, Oregon
Parks in Portland, Oregon
Protected areas established in 1966
Urban public parks
North Portland, Oregon